The Qufu Mosque is a mosque in Qufu City, Shandong Province, China.

See also
 Islam in China
 List of mosques in China

References

Buildings and structures in Shandong
Mosques in China